Mikito (written: 右人 or 幹人) is a masculine Japanese given name. Notable people with the name include:

, Japanese biathlete
, Japanese ophthalmologist

Japanese masculine given names